Mesorhizobium camelthorni is a gram-negative aerobic, non-spore-forming, motile bacteria from the genus of Mesorhizobium which was isolated from  Alhagi sparsifolia in Alaer in the Xinjiang Province in China.

References

Further reading

External links
Type strain of Mesorhizobium camelthorni at BacDive -  the Bacterial Diversity Metadatabase

Phyllobacteriaceae
Bacteria described in 2011